Jianjialong is a town in Shaodong, Hunan, China. The town is bordered to the north by Huochangping Town, to the east by Yejiping Town, to the south by Qidong County, and to the west by Shuangfeng Township.

History
On November 5, 2014, Jianjialong Township was upgraded to a town.

Administrative division
As of 2017, the town is divided into fifty villages.

Economy
The main cash crop is Chinese herbal medicine. The main crops are rice, citrus and watermelon.

Education
There are two middle schools, ten primary schools and three kindergartens in the town.

Tourism
Chengzhi House is a famous scenic spot in Shaoyang. It was built in 1812 during the Jiaqing period of the Qing dynasty (1644–1911).

References

Divisions of Shaodong